Nicholas Alan Searcy (born March 7, 1959) is an American character actor best known for portraying Chief Deputy United States Marshal Art Mullen on FX's Justified. He also had a major role in the Tom Hanks–produced miniseries From the Earth to the Moon as Deke Slayton, and directed Gosnell: The Trial of America's Biggest Serial Killer, a film released on October 12, 2018.

Life and career
Nicholas Alan Searcy was born in Cullowhee, North Carolina. He is a graduate of Cullowhee High School. He then briefly attended the North Carolina School of the Arts and graduated from the University of North Carolina at Chapel Hill with a degree in English in the summer of 1982.

From 1982 to 1989, Searcy lived in New York where he did Off-Broadway plays. Some of these included Guys and Dolls, Cabaret and Jesus Christ Superstar. When he moved back to North Carolina, he began to act in features that were shooting locally. Small parts in Days of Thunder (1990), and The Prince of Tides (1991) led to the role of the malicious husband Frank in Fried Green Tomatoes (1991) and the helpful deputy sheriff in Nell (1994).

Searcy has appeared in several television series. He had a recurring role as Brett on Thunder Alley, was a series regular on American Gothic and guest starred on Murder One and Nash Bridges with Don Johnson. He was a regular character on the UPN series Seven Days from 1998 to 2001, and played Barry Martin on the ABC series Rodney, which starred Rodney Carrington, from 2004 to 2006. He has also starred in several TV movies, including In the Best of Families: Marriage, Pride & Madness (1994), Stolen Innocence (1995). In 2014 he appeared in the CBS drama Intelligence.

In the summer of 1996, Searcy produced, directed and acted in his independent feature, Paradise Falls (1997), written by Sean Bridgers, and they won the Southeastern Media Award at the Atlanta Film Festival, the Hollywood Discovery Award at the Hollywood Film Festival for Best Feature Film (Under $1 Million) and Best Dramatic Feature at the Charleston, S.C., 1997 WorldFest. Since then, he has appeared in films such as Cast Away (2000), One Hour Photo (2002), Runaway Jury (2003), The Assassination of Richard Nixon (2005), The Ugly Truth (2009), Greater (2016),  Three Billboards Outside Ebbing, Missouri (2017) and The Shape of Water (2017).

In 2011, Searcy appeared in the Herman Cain campaign ad "Yellow Flowers" on YouTube.

In 2015, Searcy was named the director of the movie Gosnell: America's Biggest Serial Killer, a true crime drama based on convicted infant murderer Kermit Gosnell.

On December 27, 2017, Searcy was guest host of The Rush Limbaugh Show.

Personal life
Searcy resides in Southern California with his wife, actress Leslie Riley, and their two children, Chloe and Omar.

Activity on social media
Searcy is an outspoken conservative; his political and interpersonal behavior on social media, such as Twitter, has been highlighted in several news outlets. Searcy has stated, "I know people have feelings. That's why I try to hurt them."

In 2013, Searcy mocked Sean Penn's political views upon the death of dictator Hugo Chavez, for whom Penn had expressed admiration. Later that year, he responded to professional wrestler Kevin Nash's remarks on the Affordable Healthcare Act by calling him an "ass-kissing statist". In 2014, Searcy responded to several individuals in a discussion of same-sex marriage and incest, during which he mocked individuals and journalists on the basis of their weight, after they had called him and other Republicans "racist." Searcy also routinely ridiculed people because of their weight in 2015, again in response to their charges that those who opposed Democratic policies were "racist". Searcy was also noted for his criticism of Donald Trump in 2016, and reported that friends were angry at him for jokes he made about the presidential candidate at the time. Searcy reported, "I have trouble finding this election anything other than ridiculous." In 2017, he expressed uncertainty over whether he has lost work due to his political views.

Filmography

Film

Television

References

External links

1959 births
Living people
American male film actors
American male television actors
Male actors from North Carolina
People from Jackson County, North Carolina
Film directors from North Carolina
21st-century American male actors
20th-century American male actors
American male stage actors
University of North Carolina School of the Arts alumni
University of North Carolina at Chapel Hill alumni